The Minister of Mobility is a political office comparable to the Ministry of Transport in other countries. It is mainly organized at the regional level.

List of ministers

Flanders

Wallonia

Mobility